This is a list of roads designated A21. Roads are sorted in the countries' alphabetical order.

 A21 road (Australia), a road in South Australia
 A21 (Toowoomba, QLD)
 A21 motorway (Austria), a road connecting Altlengbach and the A1 to Vösendorf and the A2 
 A21 road (England), a road connecting London with Hastings on the south coast
 A21 motorway (France), a road connecting Aix-Noulette and Douai
 A 21 motorway (Germany), a road connecting the road interchange with the A 1 at Bargteheide with Wankendorf
 A21 motorway (Italy), a road connecting Turin and Brescia
 A-21 motorway (Spain), a road connecting  Jaca, Aragon and Pamplona, Navarre
 A 21 road (Sri Lanka), a road connecting Kegalle and Karawanella
 A21 road (United States of America) may refer to:
 A21 road (California), a road

See also 
 List of highways numbered 21
 List of 21A roads